The 2019 Boise State Broncos football team represented Boise State University during the 2019 NCAA Division I FBS football season. This was the Broncos' 83rd season overall, sixth under head coach Bryan Harsin, ninth as a member of the Mountain West Conference and seventh within the Mountain Division. The Broncos played their home games at Albertsons Stadium in Boise, Idaho. They finished the season 12–2, 8–0 in Mountain West play to be champions of the Mountain Division. This was the first time since joining the Mountain West in 2011 that they went undefeated in conference play. They represented the Mountain Division in the Mountain West Championship Game where they defeated Hawaii to become Mountain West champions for the fourth time. This was Boise State's 20th overall conference championship since they first joined a conference in 1970. They were invited to the Las Vegas Bowl where they lost to Washington. Boise State finished ranked in the final polls for the 13th time since 2002.

Previous season
The Broncos finished the 2018 season 10–3, 7–1 in Mountain West play to finish in a tie for first place in the Mountain Division with Utah State. Due to their head-to-head win over Utah State, they were champions of the Mountain Division. They represented the Mountain Division in the Mountain West Championship Game where they lost to West Division champion Fresno State. They were invited to the First Responder Bowl against Boston College. With 5:08 left in the 1st quarter, the bowl game was delayed and ultimately canceled and ruled a no contest. They finished the year ranked in the top 25 in both polls for the 12th time since 2002.

Preseason

Mountain West media days
The Mountain West media days will be held in July 2019 at the Cosmopolitan on the Las Vegas Strip.

Media poll
The preseason poll was released at the Mountain West media days on July 23, 2019. The Broncos were predicted to finish in first place in the MW Mountain Division.

Preseason All-Mountain West Team
The Preseason All-Mountain West Team will be chosen following the Mountain West media days in July 2019.

Offense

Defense

Specialists

Schedule

Schedule Source:

Game summaries

at Florida State

    
    
    
    
    
    
    
    
    
    
    
    

 Passing leaders: Hank Bachmeier (BSU): 30–51, 407 YDS, 1 TD, 1 INT; James Blackman (FSU): 23–33, 327 YDS, 3 TD.
 Rushing leaders: Robert Mahone (BSU): 24 CAR, 142 YDS, 2 TD; Cam Akers (FSU): 15 CAR, 116 YDS, 1 TD.
 Receiving leaders: Khalil Shakir (BSU): 8 REC, 78 YDS, 1 TD; Tamorrion Terry (FSU): 4 REC, 99 YDS, 1 TD.

Senior kicker Eric Sachse was named the Mountain West Special Teams Co-Player of the Week (shared with Nevada kicker Brandon Talton) after going 5–5 on field goals (36, 36, 41, 26, 30) and 3–3 on PAT's to score half of Boise State's points. Sachse was also named a Lou Groza Award Star of the Week for week one. Freshman quarterback Hank Bachmeier was named the as one of the Manning Award's Stars of the Week after going 30–51 for 407, 1 TD and 1 INT in his first career start. Junior running back Robert Mahone was named to the Earl Campbell Tyler Rose Award Honorable Mention list after gaining 142 yards and 2 TDs on 24 carries.

Marshall

    
    

 Passing leaders: Hank Bachmeier (BSU): 22–34, 282 YDS, 1 TD, 1 INT; Isaiah Green (MAR): 10–17, 56 YDS, 1 INT.
 Rushing leaders: George Holani (BSU): 22 CAR, 103 YDS; Brenden Knox (MAR): 10 CAR, 71 YDS, 1 TD.
 Receiving leaders: Khalil Shakir (BSU): 5 REC, 95 YDS; Xavier Gaines (MAR): 3 REC, 26 YDS.

Portland State

    
    
    
    
    
    
    
    

 Passing leaders: Hank Bachmeier (BSU): 16–25, 238 YDS, 2 TD, 1 INT; Davis Alexander (PSU): 11–23, 56 YDS, 1 TD.
 Rushing leaders: Robert Mahone (BSU): 6 CAR, 59 YDS; Davis Alexander (PSU): 12 CAR, 21 YDS.
 Receiving leaders: John Hightower (BSU): 4 REC, 79 YDS, 1 TD; Mataio Talalemotu (PSU): 5 REC, 78 YDS, 1 TD.

Air Force

    
    
    
    
    
    
    
    

 Passing leaders: Hank Bachmeier (BSU): 19–26, 263 YDS, 2 TD; Donald Hammond III	(AFA): 6–11, 83 YDS, 1 TD, 1 INT.
 Rushing leaders: Robert Mahone (BSU): 13 CAR, 73 YDS, 2 TD; Taven Birdow (AFA): 18 CAR, 67 YDS.
 Receiving leaders: CT Thomas (BSU): 5 REC, 119 YDS, 1 TD; Geraud Sanders (AFA): 5 REC, 86 YDS, 1 TD.

at UNLV

    
    
    
    
    
    
    

 Passing leaders: Hank Bachmeier (BSU): 19–30, 299 YDS, 2 TD; Kenyon Oblad (UNLV): 24–55, 262 YDS, 2 TD, 1 INT. 
 Rushing leaders: George Holani (BSU): 9 CAR, 80 YDS; Charles Williams (UNLV): 11 CAR, 57 YDS.
 Receiving leaders: Khalil Shakir (BSU): 7 REC, 111 YDS, 1 TD; Darren Woods Jr. (UNLV): 5 REC, 93 YDS, 1 TD.

Hawaii

    
    
    
    
    
    
    
    
    
    
    
    
    

 Passing leaders: Chase Cord (BSU): 12–18, 175 YDS, 3 TD; Cole McDonald (HAW): 23–41, 251 YDS, 3 TD.
 Rushing leaders: Robert Mahone (BSU): 18 CAR, 74 YDS, 1 TD; Cole McDonald (HAW): 8 CAR, 54 YDS, 1 TD.
 Receiving leaders: John Hightower (BSU): 7 REC, 141 YDS, 2 TD; Melquise Stovall (HAW): 8 REC, 114 YDS, 2 TD.

at BYU

    
    
    
    
    
    
    

 Passing leaders: Chase Cord (BSU): 18–30, 185 YDS, 2 TD, 2 INT; Baylor Romney (BYU) 15–26, 221 YDS, 2 TD.
 Rushing leaders: George Holani (BSU): 20 CAR, 97 YDS; Sione Finau (BYU) 11 CAR, 89 YDS, 1 TD.
 Receiving leaders: Octavius Evans (BSU) 5 REC, 77 YDS, 1 TD; Matt Bushman (BYU) 5 REC, 101 YDS, 2 TD.

at San Jose State

    
    
    
    
    
    
    
    
    
    
    
    
    
    

 Passing leaders: Hank Bachmeier (BSU): 13–17, 299 YDS, 1 INT; Josh Love (SJSU): 29–53, 438 YDS, 2 TD, 1 INT. 
 Rushing leaders: George Holani (BSU): 28 CAR, 134 YDS, 4 TD; Kaire Robinson (SJSU): 9 CAR, 46 YDS.
 Receiving leaders: John Hightower (BSU): 5 REC, 129 YDS; Tre Walker (SJSU): 9 REC, 193 YDS.

Wyoming

    
    
    
    
    
    

 Passing leaders: Chase Cord (BSU): 19–30, 190 YDS, 1 TD, 1 INT; Tyler Vander Waal (WYO): 15–23, 160 YDS.
 Rushing leaders: George Holani (BSU): 11 CAR, 30 YDS; Xazavian Valladay (WYO): 37 CAR, 124 YDS, 1 TD.
 Receiving leaders: Khalil Shakir (BSU): 7 REC, 70 YDS; Josh Harshman (WYO): 6 REC, 48 YDS.

New Mexico

    
    
    
    
    
    
    

 Passing leaders: Jaylon Henderson (BSU): 15–28, 292 YDS, 3 TD, 1 INT; Tevaka Tuioti (UNM): 14–21, 175 YDS.
 Rushing leaders: George Holani (BSU): 7 CAR, 73 YDS; Kentrail Moran (UNM): 10 CAR, 30 YDS.
 Receiving leaders: John Hightower (BSU): 4 REC, 124 YDS, 1 TD; Emmanuel Logan-Greene (UNM): 6 REC, 60 YDS.

at Utah State

    
    
    
    
    
    
    
    
    

    

 Passing leaders: Jaylon Henderson (BSU): 16–28, 187 YDS, 3 TD; Jordan Love (USU): 21–36, 229 YDS, 1 TD, 1 INT.
 Rushing leaders: George Holani (BSU): 16 CAR, 178 YDS, 2 TD; Gerold Bright (USU): 10 CAR, 44 YDS, 1 TD.
 Receiving leaders: John Hightower (BSU): 3 REC, 56 YDS, 1 TD; Siaosi Mariner (USU): 4 REC, 66 YDS.

at Colorado State

    
    
    
    
    
    
    
    

 Passing leaders: Jaylon Henderson (BSU): 26–36, 253 YDS, 2 TD; Patrick O'Brien (CSU): 26–40, 175 YDS.
 Rushing leaders: George Holani (BSU): 18 CAR, 42 YDS; Kentrail Moran (CSU): 9 CAR, 36 YDS, 1 TD.
 Receiving leaders: John Hightower (BSU): 7 REC, 103 YDS; Trey McBride (CSU): 9 REC, 101 YDS, 1 TD.

Source:

Hawaii (Mountain West Championship Game)

    
    
    
    
    
    

 Passing leaders: Jaylon Henderson (BSU): 20–29, 212 YDS, 2 TD, 1 INT; Cole McDonald (HAW): 20–36, 241 YDS, 1 INT.
 Rushing leaders: George Holani (BSU): 16 CAR, 67 YDS; Miles Reed (HAW): 12 CAR, 87 YDS, 1 TD.
 Receiving leaders: Khalil Shakir (BSU): 7 REC, 89 YDS, 1 TD; Jason-Matthew Sharsh (HAW): 7 REC, 74 YDS.

vs. Washington (Las Vegas Bowl)

    
    
    
    
    
    

 Passing leaders: Hank Bachmeier (BSU): 15–26, 119 YDS, 2 INT; Jacob Eason (WASH): 23–33, 210 YDS, 1 TD.
 Rushing leaders: George Holani (BSU): 11 CAR, 35 YDS; Richard Newton (WASH): 15 CAR, 69 YDS, 1 TD.
 Receiving leaders: Khalil Shakir (BSU): 3 REC, 38 YDS; Terrell Bynum (WASH): 5 REC, 67 YDS, 1 TD.

Rankings

Personnel

Coaching staff

Roster

Players drafted into the NFL

References

Boise State
Boise State Broncos football seasons
Mountain West Conference football champion seasons
Boise State Broncos football